The Adhaalath Party (AP) is a political party in the Maldives.

History
The AP was registered as a political party in August 2005, when political parties were allowed to operate for the first time following widespread protests for democracy.

Adhaalath has been active in the political arena and has been instrumental in all the recent government changes. Along with Jumhooree Party, Adhaalath has played a pivotal role in the elections, the balance of power shifting to the side to which Adhaalath Party supported during the second round of both the recent presidential elections.
The party's first president was Sheikh Hussain Rasheed Ahmed.

After the tenure of Sheikh Hussain Rasheed Ahmed, Sheikh Imran Abdullah became the second president of Adhaalath Party.
Dr. Mauroof Hussain, a noted E.N.T specialist trained in India  has been the vice president of the party since the beginning.
Since May 2015, after the Adhaalath Party together with the main opposition Maldivian Democratic Party organised a rally calling for ending government  corruption and judicial reform, the current president of the party Sheikh Imran Abdullah has been incarcerated without trial by the government of president Yameen Abdul Qayyoom after Abdullah gave a speech in support of former president Mohamed Nasheed.

On 16 February 2016, Sheikh Imran was sentenced to 12 years in prison, convicting him on a terrorism charge for the speech he gave at the opposition protest held on May 1, 2015 which the government said to have created fear and mistrust among the locals, which led to multiple injuries to police officers, locals and their properties. Following the 2018 Presidential Election, Adhaalath Party became a member of the ruling coalition government with its President Sheikh Imran serving as the Home Minister for President Ibrahim Mohamed Solih's

References

External links
Adhaalath Party Website (Dhivehi)

Sunni Islamic political parties
Political parties established in 2005
2005 establishments in the Maldives
Islamic democratic political parties
Islamic political parties in the Maldives